is a Japanese former professional footballer who played as a goalkeeper. He played for Japan national team  He is the current goalkeeper coach J2 League club of Renofa Yamaguchi.

Club career
Doi was born in Kumamoto on 25 July 1973. After graduating from high school, he joined Hitachi (later Kashiwa Reysol) in 1992. He battles with Ryuji Kato for goalkeeper position from 1997. However his opportunity to play decreased behind newcomer Yuta Minami from 1998. He moved to FC Tokyo in 2000. At 2004 J.League Cup, the club won the champions and he was selected MVP award. He played all matches from 2000 until round 32/34 in 2006 season. However his opportunity to play decreased behind Hitoshi Shiota in 2007. He moved to Tokyo Verdy with teammate Takashi Fukunishi in 2008. Although Doi played all matches in 2008 season, Verdy was relegated to J2 League. From 2011, his opportunity to play decreased behind Takahiro Shibasaki for injury in May 2011. In July 2012, Doi took regular position from Shibasaki. He retired end of 2012 season.

International career
In June 2003, Doi was selected Japan national team for 2003 Confederations Cup, but he did not play in the match. On 7 February 2004, he debuted for Japan against Malaysia. He was a member of Japan for 2004 Asian Cup Japan won the champions. He played four games for Japan until 2005. Although he was selected Japan for most matches including 2006 World Cup from 2003 to 2006, he could hardly play in the match behind Yoshikatsu Kawaguchi and Seigo Narazaki.

Career statistics

Club

International

Honors
Japan
 AFC Asian Cup: 2004

Individual
 J1 League Best Eleven: 2004

References

External links

Japan National Football Team Database

1973 births
Living people
Association football people from Kumamoto Prefecture
Japanese footballers
Japan international footballers
J1 League players
J2 League players
Japan Football League (1992–1998) players
Kashiwa Reysol players
FC Tokyo players
Tokyo Verdy players
2003 FIFA Confederations Cup players
2004 AFC Asian Cup players
2005 FIFA Confederations Cup players
2006 FIFA World Cup players
AFC Asian Cup-winning players
Association football goalkeepers